The enzyme D-lactate-2-sulfatase (EC 3.1.6.17) catalyzes the reaction 

(R)-2-O-sulfolactate + H2O  (R)-lactate + sulfate

This enzyme belongs to the family of hydrolases, specifically those acting on sulfuric ester bonds.  The systematic name is (R)-2-O-sulfolactate 2-sulfohydrolase.

The other name (S)-2-O-sulfolactate 2-sulfohydrolase specifies the stereochemistry incorrectly.

References

EC 3.1.6
Enzymes of unknown structure